Roches Noires is a village located in the Rivière du Rempart district of Mauritius, on the east coast. It has an estimated population of 5,733 inhabitants.

Roches Noires is a residential area, with many of the bungalows and villas occupied as secondary residences.

This part of the coast located near the village consists of several secluded coves of white sand beach. In several places around Roches Noires, the reef comes to within 50 meters of the shore.

Popular attractions include the "La Cave Madame" in the Royal Road, the public beach, and the "Pointe de Roches Noires", also known as "La mer Milles".

Rivière du Rempart District